The loop electrosurgical excision procedure (LEEP) is one of the most commonly used approaches to treat high grade cervical dysplasia (CIN II/III, HGSIL) discovered on colposcopic examination. In the UK, it is known as large loop excision of the transformation zone (LLETZ).

LEEP has many advantages including low cost and a high success rate. The procedure can be done in an office setting and usually only requires a local anesthetic, though sometimes IV sedation or a general anesthetic is used.

Process
When performing a LEEP, the physician uses a wire loop through which an electric current is passed at variable power settings. Various shapes and sizes of loop can be used depending on the size and orientation of the lesion.  The cervical transformation zone and lesion are excised to an adequate depth, which in most cases is at least 8 mm, and extending 4 to 5 mm beyond the lesion. A second pass with a more narrow loop can also be done to obtain an endocervical specimen for further histologic evaluation.

The LEEP technique results in some thermal artifact in all specimens obtained due to the use of electricity which simultaneously cuts and cauterizes the lesion, but this does not generally interfere with pathological interpretation.

Complications
Complications are less frequent in comparison to a cold-knife conization but can include infection and hemorrhage.

A survey study has indicated that the LEEP procedure does not appear to affect fertility. On the other hand, a case-control study has found an association between surgical treatment of CIN lesions and risk of infertility or subfertility, with an odds ratio of approximately 2. Scarring of the cervix is a theoretical mechanism of causing trouble conceiving. This scar tissue can be massaged or broken up in a number of ways, thus allowing the cervical opening to dilate back to normal size.

A cohort study came to the result that women with a time interval from LEEP to pregnancy of less than 12 months compared with 12 months or more were at significantly increased risk for miscarriage, with risk of  miscarriage of 18% compared with 4.6%, respectively. On the other hand, no increased risk was identified for preterm birth after LEEP.
However a large meta-analysis concluded that women with CIN have a higher baseline risk for preterm birth than the general population and that LEEP as the treatment for CIN probably increase this risk further. Also, the risk of preterm birth appears to increase with multiple treatments and increasing amounts of tissue removed.

A study found that women reported a statistically significant decrease in sexual satisfaction following LEEP.

See also
 Cervicectomy

References

Female genital procedures
Surgical oncology